Dashoguz Mosque or Daşoguz metjidi is a mosque in Daşoguz, Turkmenistan, the main mosque of Daşoguz Region. The mosque accommodates up to 3,000 worshipers at a time and is located on Görogly avenue.

History 
The foundation-laying ceremony took place in 2013.

It was inaugurated by Gurbanguly Berdimuhamedov, the president of Turkmenistan, on 30 October 2015.

Architecture 
The diameter of the mosaic-style central dome of the mosque is 38 meters, the height is 40 meters, and the height of each of the four minarets is 63 meters.

In the mosque, 3 thousand people can pray. A pavilion was built on the territory of the mosque to hold a sadaqa for 1,500 people, as well as a three-story hotel for 200 people.

References

Mosques in Turkmenistan
Mosques completed in 2015
2015 establishments in Turkmenistan